Diario de América (America's Daily) is a Spanish-language opinion journal about politics, economics, culture and social issues, published in the United States.

Its contents are updated daily with opinion pieces by columnists from Latin America, Europe and the United States.

It was founded as El Iberoamericano on Columbus Day, 2004, and in its relatively short lifetime it has become a vehicle of opinion in several Spanish-speaking countries and among the U.S. Hispanic community.

Diario de América's "Declaration of Purpose" cites as its main objective "the dissemination of opinions whose essential purpose is the defense of the cause of human freedom." Its editorial line can be described as libertarian, conservative and strongly influenced by Western thought, upholding the values of individual autonomy, private property and a laissez-faire economic policy.

Its founder and editor-in-chief is Pablo Kleinman.

External links
 

Libertarian magazines published in the United States
Online magazines published in the United States
Magazines established in 2004
Magazines published in Los Angeles
Spanish-language magazines
Spanish-language mass media in California